J. Clement Cicilline (born February 7, 1940) is an American politician who served in the Rhode Island Senate from the 50th district from 1993 to 2003.

References

1940 births
Living people
Democratic Party Rhode Island state senators